Cathédrale du Sacré-Cœur d'Oran (Sacred Heart Cathedral of Oran) is a former Roman Catholic church located at Place de la Kahina, on Boulevard Hammou-boutlelis, in Oran, Algeria.

History
The church building was built between 1903 and 1913 to the design of Albert Ballu, the architect of the Government of Algeria, and by the company of Auguste and Gustave Perret. The structure of the church itself is of reinforced concrete, which made it the first church built out of this in French overseas territories. It was dedicated on 30 April 1930.

The cathedral became a regional library in 1984, then a public library in 1996.

See also
Cathédrale du Sacré-Cœur d'Alger

References

Buildings and structures in Oran
Libraries in Algeria
Roman Catholic cathedrals in Algeria
Tourist attractions in Oran
20th-century Roman Catholic church buildings in Algeria